Unity Biotechnology is a publicly traded American biotechnology company that develops drugs that target senescent cells.

The company's products in development include UBX 1325, which targets Bcl-xL, a mechanism to eliminate senescent cells in age-related eye diseases (in Phase 1 clinical trials for diabetic macular edema as of October 2020). In July 2022, the company reported positive results from its Phase 1 study. They also include UBX 1967, a preclinical product targeting ophthalmologic diseases. Both products are senolytic medicines.

On May 3, 2018, the company went public on the Nasdaq exchange, raising $85 million at a market capitalization of $700 million. Unity Biotechnology shares dropped 60% on August 17, 2020, after the company reported disappointing results from a clinical trial involving its lead drug candidate, UBX0101, in patients with moderate-to-severe painful osteoarthritis.

See also
Senolytics
Calico

References

External links
Official website

Biotechnology companies of the United States
Pharmaceutical companies established in 2011
Biotechnology companies established in 2011
Companies based in South San Francisco, California
Brisbane, California
2018 initial public offerings
Companies listed on the Nasdaq